Dubrava Hydro Power Plant is a large power plant in Croatia that has four turbines with a nominal capacity of 21 MW each having a total capacity of 84 MW.

The power plant uses Lake Dubrava as its reservoir and was completed in 1989. It is located near the village of Sveta Marija in Međimurje County, not far from Donja Dubrava municipality seat, on the county's border with Varaždin County. The reservoir is also divided between the two counties.

It is operated by Hrvatska elektroprivreda.

External links

Hydroelectric power stations in Croatia
Buildings and structures in Varaždin County
Energy infrastructure completed in 1989
Buildings and structures in Međimurje County